Sabbath is the name of a recurring villain from the Eighth Doctor Adventures — spin-off novels based on the BBC science fiction television series Doctor Who. The character was created by Lawrence Miles and first appeared in The Adventuress of Henrietta Street. Originally, Miles had intended Sabbath to be a one-off character, but BBC Books editor Justin Richards asked to use the character in a continuing story arc.

Sabbath was born in 1740. He was educated at Cambridge before being initiated into the Secret Service in 1762. He then defected from the service in 1780. The Doctor first encountered Sabbath in 1782.

In appearance, Sabbath was a large muscular man with a shaven head. He commanded intelligent ape creatures called Babewyns which also crewed his ship, the Jonah. Visually, the Doctor Who version is said to be based on Orson Welles.

Despite suggestions to the contrary, Sabbath is not based on the equally corpulent character Sunday from the novel The Man Who Was Thursday (1904) by G. K. Chesterton, though this is jokingly alluded to in the Doctor Who novel History 101 (2002).

Character history

Sabbath first appears as the unnamed character who brings Anji Kapoor out of a fugue state in The Slow Empire, although from her perspective she hasn't met him yet.

In his first appearance, we learn that Sabbath was originally a renegade member of the British Secret Service during the late 18th century. It was explained that it is customary for agents to take Biblical names, and Sabbath's name derived itself from a Jewish Kabalistic trend in the Service during the time period of his initiation. His initiation into the Service involved him being thrown into the River Thames bound in thirteen chains and thirteen locks, covered in sackcloth. Sabbath survived by encountering Leviathan, who rescued him.

When the Doctor encountered him, Sabbath was attempting to build a temporal battleship, the Jonah, in order to travel beyond the realm of human understanding, though he was callous about other people's lives in his quest. Indeed, Sabbath was not the main villain of the book, and was in fact instrumental in saving the Doctor's life. Sabbath's literal role was made clear when the Doctor spoke with a character that fans assume by the description to be the Master (though he is never mentioned explicitly). The Master claimed that Sabbath-like characters were the new masters of time, a position once held by the Doctor's people until the destruction of their home world. Sabbath was intended as a new breed of villain, time-active and less apt to pure megalomania.

Sabbath believed himself to be the protector of humanity. He was first drawn to the Doctor believing him to be responsible for the arrival of the Babewyn creatures on Earth. When the Doctor fell ill, Sabbath removed the Doctor's second heart from his body which had become shrunken and blackened, apparently as a result of Gallifrey's destruction. Sabbath then implanted that heart into himself in an attempt to gain the time-travelling capability of a Time Lord. The Doctor is manipulated by Sabbath in several of his subsequent adventures, with Anachrophobia and History 101 seeing Sabbath create a situation where the Doctor will perceive a race of clock-faced creatures and an agent for a complex information-gathering system as a threat, when in reality they were only a true threat to Sabbath's associates, with the clock-faced-creatures' 'invasion' of a human colony actually being an evacuation from their destruction by Sabbath's masters in the Time Vortex and the system only a threat as it might have recorded information Sabbath's allies would prefer kept discreet. In Trading Futures, the Doctor also encountered some of Sabbath's new agents, allegedly trying to protect the timeline while seeing the Doctor as a renegade, but they lacked Sabbath's skill and were defeated by the Doctor's semi-ally Cosgrove.

When the Doctor was crushed by a 30-pound theatre sandbag in the England of 1893 (Camera Obscura by Lloyd Rose), he discovered that he could not die whilst his second heart was lodged within Sabbath. Sabbath later removed the heart, severing the biodata link between the two of them. During this time, the Doctor learned that Sabbath believed that time travellers created new timelines every time they travelled, with the universe allegedly unable to exist if too many of these timelines were created.

When Sabbath tried to use an event in the Siberia of 1893 (Time Zero by Justin Richards) to collapse all of reality down to a single timeline, the Doctor's interference instead caused the creation of multiple parallel universes by breaking down the barriers between parallel universes. Sabbath set about trying to save the true reality, but his actions were hindered by his comparatively limited understanding of Time causing him to misunderstand how to limit the damage (as well as the actions of an alternate version of himself that had been manipulated by his associates' enemies (The Domino Effect)). In Timeless by Stephen Cole he was instrumental in doing so, although he and the Doctor were trying to reach similar goals at cross purposes. It was revealed that he worked for beings which claimed to be the future of humanity, and told him he was working to make humans the new Time Lords. When he learnt this was untrue, he turned against them.

In Sometime Never..., also by Richards, Sabbath's former employers were revealed as the Council of Eight, eight crystalline entities (who coincidentally resembled the eight Doctors) based in the time vortex. The Council gained power from making accurate predictions, hence their interest in maintaining a stable single timeline. In order to ensure their power, their corrupt leader, Octan, had made a prediction that human history would be destroyed before it began, with the energy of such a vast prediction permanently stabilizing his peoples' existence, but he still required a sufficiently significant predicted event to power the weapon that would destroy Earth's sun in the first place. After Octan confirmed that the prediction was based on whether Sabbath would kill the Doctor or Octan at a crucial moment, the Doctor tricked Octan into confirming that he had predicted his own death, but Sabbath, rather than kill the Doctor, instead chose to essentially commit suicide, damning himself to an eternity of agony in the Time Vortex as it was the one action Octan could never have predicted he would do.

Other appearances
There are in fact three different characters called Sabbath, who may or may not be iterations of the same person in different timelines. The Sabbath who appears in the Doctor Who books exists in a timeline in which the Time Lords have ceased to exist and humanity has become the potential heir to their powers and knowledge.

However, the Time Lords (or Great Houses) still exist in the Faction Paradox series, in which Sabbath appears as a young man (voiced by Saul Jaffe in the audio plays and also appearing in the comics) with the Service, ignorant of the wider cosmology.

List of appearances

Doctor Who
The Slow Empire by Dave Stone (unnamed cameo)
Father Time by Lance Parkin (unnamed cameo)
The Adventuress of Henrietta Street by Lawrence Miles
Anachrophobia by Jonathan Morris
Trading Futures by Lance Parkin (cameo; the Doctor meets some of Sabbath's agents)
History 101 by Mags L Halliday
Camera Obscura by Lloyd Rose
Time Zero by Justin Richards
The Infinity Race by Simon Messingham
The Domino Effect by David Bishop (alternate version of the Sabbath encountered previously)
The Last Resort by Paul Leonard
Timeless by Stephen Cole
Emotional Chemistry by Simon A. Forward
Sometime Never... by Justin Richards (essentially 'dies' to save the Doctor)

Faction Paradox
The Book of the War
Sabbath Dei and In the Year of the Cat (2-part audio drama)
Movers and A Labyrinth of Histories (2-part audio drama)
Sabbath and the King (audio drama)

References

I, Who 3, Lars Pearson, Mad Norwegian Press, 2003

Literary characters introduced in 2001
Doctor Who book characters
Faction Paradox
Male characters in literature
Fictional people from the 18th-century